Inge Margriet Zegers-de Ruiter (born 29 April 1954) is a retired Dutch field hockey defender, who won a gold medal at the 1984 Summer Olympics. From 1980 to 1984 she played 55 international matches and scored no goals. She is married to Olympic freestyle skier Michiel de Ruiter.

References

External links
 

1954 births
Living people
Dutch female field hockey players
Olympic field hockey players of the Netherlands
Field hockey players at the 1984 Summer Olympics
Olympic gold medalists for the Netherlands
Sportspeople from Heerenveen
Olympic medalists in field hockey
Medalists at the 1984 Summer Olympics
20th-century Dutch women